Leptolalax bidoupensis is a species of frog in the family Megophryidae from Vietnam.

References

bidoupensis
Amphibians described in 2011